The first Dutch settlers arrived in America in 1624 and founded a number of villages, a town called New Amsterdam and the Colony of New Netherland on the East Coast. New Amsterdam became New York when the Treaty of Breda was signed in 1667. According to the 2006 United States Census, more than 5 million Americans claim total or partial Dutch heritage. Today the majority of the Dutch Americans live in the U.S. states of California, New York, Michigan, Iowa, Washington, Minnesota, Wisconsin, Montana, Ohio and Pennsylvania.

This is a list of notable Dutch Americans, including both original immigrants who obtained American citizenship and Americans of full or partial Dutch ancestry.

List

Arts and literature
 Earl W. Bascom (1906–1995), artist, sculptor, inventor, author, known as the "dean of rodeo cowboy sculpture" 
 Edward W. Bok (1863–1930), author, publisher, editor of Ladies Home Journal
Willem de Kooning (1904–1997), abstract expressionist painter
 Peter DeVries (1910–1993), author and editor; wrote Tunnel of Love; editor and staffer for Poetry magazine and The New Yorker
Barthold Fles (1902–1989), literary agent, author, editor, translator and publisher
Charles Fort (1874–1932), author, wrote Book of the Damned, father of ufology, cryptozoology and critic/satirist of mainstream, dogmatic science
Frederick Franck (1909–2006), painter, sculptor, and author of 30 books who was known for his interest in human spirituality
Marius Jansen (1922–2000), American academic, historian, and Emeritus Professor of Japanese History at Princeton University.
 Herman Melville (1819–1891), author and poet, wrote Moby Dick
 Milton J. Nieuwsma (born 1941), author, film writer and producer
 Erwin Timmers (born 1964), Dutch-American environmental "green artist", glass sculptor and teacher
 Raeburn van Buren, magazine and comic strip illustrator best known for his work on the syndicated Abbie an' Slats
 Edward Stratemeyer, (1862–1930), author
 Janwillem van de Wetering (1931–2008), Dutch-American author of police procedurals, Zen autobiographies and children's books
 Philip Van Doren Stern (1900–1984), author
 Hendrik Willem Van Loon (1882–1944), author, historian and journalist
 Gloria Vanderbilt (1924–2019), artist and socialite
 Walt Whitman (1819–1892), poet
 Jeff VanderMeer (born 1968), author

Entertainment

 Christina Aguilera (born 1980), singer, actress and model, partly of Dutch descent through her mother
 Alison Brie (born 1982), actress, partly of Dutch descent through her father
 Dan Aykroyd (born 1952), actor
 Reiko Aylesworth (born 1972), actress, best known for playing Michelle Dessler in the television series 24
 Earl Bascom (1906–1995), cowboy actor in "Lawless Rider" and a descendant of the Coerten and Cos families of New Jersey
 Aaron Paul (born 1979), actor
 Carmit Bachar (born 1974), member of the Pussycat Dolls, born to an Israeli father and Dutch-Indonesian mother
 Shannon Bex (born 1980), member of Danity Kane; of Scottish and Dutch descent
 Moon Bloodgood (born 1975), actress (father has a small amount of Dutch ancestry)
 Humphrey Bogart (1899–1957), actor (father was of part Dutch descent; "Bogart" comes from the Dutch surname Bogaert, derived from "bogaard", short for "boomgaard", which means "orchard")
 Hobart Bosworth (1867–1943), actor, director, writer and producer
 Michelle Branch (born 1983), singer (Dutch through her maternal grandfather)
 Marlon Brando (1924–2004), Hollywood film actor; father was of partial Dutch ancestry
 Clancy Brown (born 1959), actor
 Steve Buscemi (born 1957), actor, writer and director, mother had some Dutch ancestry
 Captain Beefheart (1941–2010), stage name of musician and artist Don Van Vliet
 David Carradine (1936–2009), actor, distant Dutch ancestry
 Ever Carradine (born 1974), actress and daughter of Robert Carradine, distant Dutch ancestry
 John Carradine (1906–1988), actor, distant Dutch ancestry; descended from Dutch diamond merchant Kiliaen van Rensselaer, who settled the province of Albany, New York, in the seventeenth century
 Keith Carradine (born 1949), actor and son of John Carradine, distant Dutch ancestry
 Robert Carradine (born 1954), actor, distant Dutch ancestry
 Montgomery Clift (1920–1966), actor, of partial maternal Dutch ancestry
 Wilhelmina Cooper (née Behmenburg) (1939–1980), model who began with Ford Models; at the peak of her success she founded her own agency, Wilhelmina Models
 Jan de Bont (born 1943), film director, producer and cinematographer
 Robert De Niro (born 1943), two-time Academy Award-winning actor, mother of part Dutch descent
 Dane DeHaan (born 1986), film actor, paternal great-grandfather was of Dutch descent
 Thomas Dekker (born 1987), actor, his paternal great-grandfather was of Dutch descent
 Cecil B. DeMille (1881–1959), film director and producer
 Emily Deschanel (born 1976), actress best known for her role as Dr. Temperance "Bones" Brennan in the comedy-crime drama series Bones, distant Dutch ancestry
 Zooey Deschanel (born 1980), actress, distant Dutch ancestry
 Joyce DeWitt (born 1949), actress
 Michael Douglas (born 1944), actor and producer who won four Golden Globes and two Academy Awards, distant Dutch ancestry on mother's side
 Clint Eastwood (born 1930), Academy Award-winning film actor, director and producer, distant Dutch ancestry
 Frances Farmer (1913–1970), film actress, her mother was of Dutch ancestry
 Melissa Ferlaak (born 1979), soprano singer and vocal coach, distant Dutch ancestry (original spelling of her surname was Verlaak)
 Nina Foch (1924–2008), film actress, father was from the Netherlands
 Bridget Fonda (born 1964), actress, daughter of Peter Fonda, best known for her roles in The Godfather Part III and Jackie Brown, father of part Dutch descent
 Henry Fonda (1905–1982), Academy Award-winning film actor, father of Peter and Jane Fonda, was of part Dutch descent
 Jane Fonda (born 1937), Academy Award-winning actress, daughter of Henry Fonda, father was of part Dutch descent
 Peter Fonda (1940–2019), actor, best known for his role as "Wyatt" in the 1960s counterculture classic Easy Rider, father was of part Dutch descent
 Ace Frehley (born 1951), musician, Dutch on paternal side
 Troy Garity (born 1973), actor; son of Jane Fonda; best known for his roles in the television movie Soldier's Girl and the Barbershop films
 Janina Gavankar (born 1980), actress of Indian and Dutch ancestry
 George Gaynes (1917–2016), actor and singer, father was Dutch
 Lauren German (born 1978), film actress
 Paul Giamatti (born 1967), actor, distant Dutch ancestry
 Mark-Paul Gosselaar (born 1974), actor, perhaps best known for his role as Zack Morris on NBC's Saved by the Bell; his father is of Dutch Jewish and German descent, and his mother is of Dutch-Indonesian descent
 Lucas Grabeel (born 1984), American actor, distant Dutch ancestry, best known for his role as Ryan Evans in High School Musical
 Betty Grable (1916–1973), actress, singer, dancer and pin-up girl whose sensational bathing-suit photo became the number one pinup of the World War II era
 Bella Hadid (born 1996), model
 Gigi Hadid (born 1995), model
 Rebecca Hall (born 1982), maternal grandmother was Dutch
 Philip Seymour Hoffman (1967–2014), actor, distant Dutch ancestry
Whitney Houston (1963–2012), actor, singer, distant Dutch ancestry
 Bryce Dallas Howard (born 1981), actress; daughter of director Ron Howard; distant Dutch ancestry
 Clint Howard (born 1959), actor and brother of director Ron Howard, distant Dutch ancestry
 Ron Howard (born 1954), Academy Award-winning director, producer and actor, best known for directing Apollo 13, How the Grinch Stole Christmas and A Beautiful Mind, distant Dutch ancestry
 Michiel Huisman (born 1981), actor, musician, singer-songwriter, best known for his roles in Game of Thrones and The Age of Adaline
 Noname Jane, pornographic actress
 Laura Jansen (born 1977), singer-songwriter (born in Breda, the Netherlands, based in Los Angeles, California)
 Famke Janssen (born 1964), fashion model and actress, best known for her roles as Bond girl Xenia Onatopp in GoldenEye, Jean Grey in the X-Men film series, and Lenore Mills in Taken and Taken 2
 Angelina Jolie (born 1975), actress; her mother had French Canadian, German, and Dutch ancestry
 Kylie Jenner (born 1997), reality star, social media personality and socialite best known for her best seller makeup line Kylie Cosmetics
 Charles Judels (1882–1969), actor
 Kim Kardashian (born 1980), actress and model; appeared in Disaster Movie; distant Dutch ancestry
 Kris Kristofferson (born 1936), actor and singer
 Eva LaRue (born 1966), actress of Scottish, French, and Dutch ancestry; played Dr. Maria Santos on All My Children, and CSI: Miami detective Natalia Boa Vista
 Taylor Lautner (born 1992), actor, best known from his role as Jacob Black in the Twilight Saga film series, has some Dutch ancestry
 Kellan Lutz (born 1985), actor, small amount of Dutch ancestry
 Tim McGraw, country singer, small amount of Dutch ancestry 
 Meghan Markle (born 1981), actress, model and humanitarian, of part Dutch descent on her father's side
 Leighton Meester (born 1986), actress, best known for her role as Blair Waldorf in Gossip Girl, of part Dutch descent on father's side
 Wentworth Miller (born 1972), actor and model best known his role as Michael Scofield on the television series Prison Break, small amount of Dutch ancestry
 Steve Oedekerk (born 1961), actor and comedian, paternal grandfather was Afrikaner of Dutch descent
 Colonel Tom Parker (1909–1997), manager of Elvis Presley
 Michelle Pfeiffer (born 1958), actress, best known for her roles in Scarface, Dangerous Liaisons, The Fabulous Baker Boys, Batman Returns and Grease 2; paternal grandmother was of part Dutch descent
 Bill Pullman (born 1953), actor, best known for his roles in Ruthless People, Spaceballs, Independence Day, While You Were Sleeping and Lost Highway; maternal grandparents were Dutch
 Jason Ritter (born 1980), actor, distant Dutch ancestry
 John Ritter (1948–2003), actor, distant Dutch ancestry
 Rebecca Romijn (born 1972), actress and fashion model, best known for her role as Mystique in the X-Men film series, of 3/4 Dutch descent
 Thelma Schoonmaker (born 1940), three-time Academy Award-winning film editor, best known for editing all of Martin Scorsese's movies since Raging Bull, of part Dutch ancestry
 Jane Seymour (born 1951), actress; best known as Bond girl in Live and Let Die and as Dr. Quinn Medicine Woman; has a Dutch mother
 Michael Sinterniklaas, voice actor and founder of NYAV Post, a New York recording studio 
 Jimmy Smits (born 1955), Golden Globe and Emmy-winning actor; half Dutch, half Puerto Rican
 Cobie Smulders (born 1982), actress and model of Dutch and English descent
 Martin Spanjers (born 1987), actor best known for playing Rory Hennessy on the sitcom 8 Simple Rules
 Bruce Springsteen (born 1949), singer-songwriter, distant Dutch ancestry
 Carel Struycken (born 1948), film actor
 Taylor Swift (born 1989), country and pop singer, distant Dutch ancestry
 Lou Tellegen (1881–1934), film actor
 Shirley Temple (1928–2013), actress
 Charlize Theron (born 1975), South African actress of German, Dutch and French descent, now naturalized citizen of the United States
 Egbert Van Alstyne (1878–1951), songwriter and pianist
 Louis van Amstel (born 1972), professional dancer, choreographer, dancesport coach
 Amedee J. Van Beuren (1879–1938), film producer
 Lee Van Cleef (1925–1989), film actor, best known for his parts as a villain in Spaghetti Western movies, of part Dutch descent
 Anneliese van der Pol (born 1984), television actress, perhaps best known for her role as Chelsea Daniels in the Disney Channel original comedy series, That's So Raven
 Grace VanderWaal (born 2004), singer and musician
 Casper Van Dien (born 1968), actor, of part Dutch descent
 Barry Van Dyke (born 1951), actor and son of Dick Van Dyke
 Dick Van Dyke (born 1925), famous television and film star; brother of Jerry Van Dyke
 Jerry Van Dyke (1931–2018), television actor; brother of Dick Van Dyke
 W. S. Van Dyke (1889–1943), director
 Alex Van Halen (born 1953), drummer and founding member of the hard rock band Van Halen
 Eddie Van Halen (1955–2020), guitarist and founding member of the hard rock band Van Halen
 Dick Van Patten (1928–2015), actor of part Dutch descent
 Tim Van Patten (born 1959), director, producer, actor and screenwriter
 Gus Van Sant (born 1952), director
 Edward Van Sloan (1882–1964), actor
 Andrew Van Wyngarden (born 1983), musician of Dutch descent
 Billy Van Zandt (born 1957), playwright, actor
 Philip Van Zandt (1904–1958), Broadway and Hollywood actor
 Townes Van Zandt (1944–1997), country-folk music singer-songwriter, performer, and poet
 Donnie Van Zant (born 1952), founder and singer of .38 Special
 Johnny Van Zant (born 1959), lead singer of Lynyrd Skynyrd since 1987
 Ronnie Van Zant (1948–1977), lead singer of Lynyrd Skynyrd from 1970 to 1977
 Paul Verhoeven (born 1938), film director
 Donald Voorhees (1903–1989), composer and conductor
 Dionne Warwick (born 1940), singer, actress and TV show host; became a United Nations Global Ambassador for the Food and Agriculture Organization and a United States Ambassador of Health; distant Dutch ancestry
Brandon deWilde (1942-1972), American theater, film, and television actor
Rainn Wilson (born 1966), actor of Dutch descent through mother
Kristen Schaal (born 1978), actress and comedian of Dutch Lutheran descent
Steven Seagal (born 1952), actor, of Dutch descent through his mother
Noah Centineo (born 1996), actor, To All the Boys I've Loved Before & Sierra Burgess Is a Loser. He is of Dutch descent.
Lauren German (born 1979), actress, Lucifer (TV series). She has a paternal grandfather who was Dutch and born in Amsterdam circa 1909.
Lesley-Ann Brandt (born 1981)), actress, Lucifer (TV series). Of Dutch descent together with German, Spanish and Indian.

Journalism 

Rachel Maddow (born 1973), MSNBC journalist, paternal grandmother is of dutch descent. 
 Anderson Cooper (born 1967), CNN journalist, mother is Dutch-American socialite Gloria Vanderbilt
 Walter Cronkite (1916–2009), CBS Evening News journalist
 Watson Spoelstra (1910–1999), sportswriter for the Detroit News, grandfather of Erik Spoelstra
 Greta Van Susteren (born 1954), Fox News journalist
 Michiel Vos (born 1970), journalist, made documentary Diary of a Political Tourist

Military

 Cornplanter (John Abeel III) (died 1836), Seneca war chief who fought in the French and Indian War and the American Revolutionary War. Great-grandson of Johannes Abeel.
 Eugene DeBruin (fl. 1933–1968), USAF sergeant; disappeared over Laos in 1968
 Franklin Van Valkenburgh (1888–1941), served as the last captain of the USS Arizona (BB-39). He was honored posthumously with a Medal of Honor following his death during the Attack on Pearl Harbor.
 John L. DeWitt (1880–1962), US four-star general during World War II
 John Bell Hood (1831–1879), Confederate general during the American Civil War
 James Longstreet (1821–1904), Confederate Lieutenant-General in the American Civil War
 Jack Robert Lousma (born 1936), retired United States Marine Corps colonel, aeronautical engineer, NASA astronaut (member of the second manned crew on the Skylab space station in 1973, commander STS-3, the third Space Shuttle mission), and politician (R)
 Thomas S. Moorman (1910–1997), United States Air Force Academy
 Thomas S. Moorman, Jr. (1940–2020), Vice Chief of Staff of the United States Air Force
 David Petraeus (born 1952), US four-star general; commander in Iraq in 2007; his father is an immigrant from the Netherlands
 Theodore Roosevelt, Jr. (1887–1944), US brigadier general; Medal of Honor; fought in both world wars
 Henry Rutgers (1745–1830), American Revolutionary War hero
 Robert M. Shoemaker (1924–2017), US four-star general during the Vietnam War
 Eric Schoomaker (born 1948), US three-star general; Surgeon General of the United States Army
 Peter Schoomaker (born 1946), US four-star general; Chief of Staff of the United States Army
 Philip John Schuyler (1733–1804), general in the American Revolution and US Senator from New York
 Earl Van Dorn (1820–1863), Confederate general during the American Civil War
 James Van Fleet (1892–1992), US four-star general; Army general during World War II and the Korean War
 Cortlandt Van Rensselaer Schuyler (1900–1993), US Army four-star general; served as chief of staff of Supreme Headquarters Allied Powers Europe from 1953 to 1959
 Daniel Van Voorhis (1878–1956), United States Army lieutenant general
 Isaac Van Wart (1759–1828), militiaman from the state of New York during the American Revolution; in 1780, he participated in the capture of Major John André
 Alexander Archer Vandegrift (1887–1973), US four-star general; Medal of Honor; 18th commandant of the US Marine Corps
 Hoyt Sanford Vandenberg (1899–1954), US four-star general during World War II; second chief of staff of US Air Force Director Central Intelligence Agency
 Jocko Willink (born 1971), US Navy SEAL retired officer, podcaster and author

Politics

Johannes Abeel (1667–1711), second and thirteenth Mayor of Albany, New York
Egbert Benson, Founding Father of the United States
Jacob Brinkerhoff (1810–1880), United States Representative from Ohio
George H. W. Bush (1924–2018), 41st President of the United States
George P. Bush (born 1976), current Commissioner of the Texas General Land Office
George W. Bush (born 1946), 43rd President of the United States
Jeb Bush (born 1953), Governor of Florida
Prescott Bush (1895–1972), Senator from Connecticut
Hillary Clinton (née Rodham) (born 1947), wife of Bill Clinton; 67th United States Secretary of State
Charles Croswell (1825–1886), Governor of Michigan
Ivo Daalder (born 1960), 20th United States Permanent Representative to NATO
Harry DeBoer (1905–1991), trotskyist trade union leader
Dick DeVos (born 1955), Republican candidate for Governor of Michigan
Frank Ellsworth Doremus (1865–1947), United States Representative from Michigan
Hamilton Fish, 26th United States Secretary of State
Rodney Frelinghuysen (born 1946), United States Representative from New Jersey
Todd Gloria (born 1978), member of the San Diego City Council
Warren G. Harding (1865–1923), 29th President of the United States
John Hickenlooper (born 1952), 42nd and current Governor of Colorado
Pete Hoekstra (born 1953), United States Representative from Michigan and United States Ambassador to the Netherlands
John Hoeven (born 1957), United States Senator from North Dakota
Harold G. Hoffman (1896–1954), 41st Governor of New Jersey
Bill Huizenga (born 1969), United States Representative from Michigan
Kenny Hulshof (born 1958), United States Representative from Missouri
Robert H. Jackson (1892–1954), 74th Associate Justice of the Supreme Court
John Jay (1745–1829), Founding Father of the United States, United States Secretary of State and 1st Chief Justice of the United States
Bartel J. Jonkman, United States Representative from Michigan 
Martin Kalbfleisch (1804–1873), United States Representative from New York
Thomas Kean (born 1935), 48th Governor of New Jersey
Herman Knickerbocker (1779–1855), United States Representative from New York
John Lindsay (1920–2000), Mayor of New York City and United States Representative from New York
Bob Livingston (born 1943), United States Representative from Louisiana
Henry Demarest Lloyd (1847–1903), progressive political activist
David Mathews (1739–1800), last Mayor of New York City of British North America during the American Revolution
Elizabeth Monroe (1768–1830), wife of James Monroe; of paternal English and maternal Dutch ancestry
Marshall Mouw (born 1942), Mayor of the City of Glendora
Dave Mulder (born 1939), State Senator from Iowa
A. J. Muste (1885–1967), socialist militant active in the pacifist movement, labor movement and U.S. civil rights movement
William Penn (1644–1718), the founder of Philadelphia
Dick Posthumus (born 1950), 61st Lieutenant Governor of Michigan
John V. L. Pruyn (1811–1877), United States Representative from New York
Eleanor Roosevelt (1884–1962), wife of Franklin D. Roosevelt
Franklin D. Roosevelt (1882–1945), 32nd President of the United States
Theodore Roosevelt (1858–1919), 26th President of the United States
Marge Roukema (1929–2014), United States Representative from New Jersey
Albert Janse Ryckman (c. 1642–1737), Mayor of Albany, New York; prominent Brewer; captain of the Albany Malitia
Philip Schuyler (1733–1804), general in the American Revolutionary War; United States Senator from New York
Alan K. Simpson (born 1931), United States Senator from Wyoming
Kyrsten Sinema (born 1976), United States Congresswoman and US Senator from Arizona
Peter Stuyvesant (1612–1672), Director-General of the colony of New Amsterdam (later New York)
Fred Thompson (1942–2015), U.S. Senator and actor
George Bell Timmerman, Jr. (1912–1994), Governor of South Carolina
Martin Van Buren (1782–1862), 8th President of the United States
Jacobus Van Cortlandt (1658–1739), two-time Mayor of New York City
Pierre Van Cortlandt (1721–1814), 1st Lieutenant Governor of New York
Stephanus Van Cortlandt (1643–1700), first native-born Mayor of New York City, grandfather of Pierre van Cortlandt
John Van de Kamp (1936–2017), Attorney General of California (1983–1991)
Chris Van Hollen (born 1959), United States Representative from Maryland
Espy Van Horne (1795–1829), United States Representative from Pennsylvania
Isaac B. Van Houten (1776–1850), United States Representative from New York
Cornelius P. Van Ness (1782–1852), 10th Governor of Vermont and Envoy Extraordinary and Minister Plenipotentiary to the Kingdom of Spain
Frederick Van Nuys (1874–1944), United States Senator from Indiana
Stephen Van Rensselaer (1764–1839), 2nd Lieutenant Governor of New York and one of the richest Americans ever to have lived
Robert B. Van Valkenburgh (1762–1834), United States Representative from New York
Murray Van Wagoner (1821–1888), United States Representative from New York
Robert Anderson Van Wyck (1849–1918), 1st Mayor of New York City after the consolidation of the five boroughs into the City of New York in 1898
Cornelius Van Wyck Lawrence (1791–1861), 1st popularly elected Mayor of New York City
Tim Van Zandt (1762–1834), United States Representative from Missouri
Arthur Vandenberg (1884–1951), United States Senator from Michigan
Guy Vander Jagt (1931–2007), United States Representative from Michigan
Richard Vander Veen (1922–2006), United States Representative from Michigan
William Henry Vanderbilt III (1901–1981), Governor of Rhode Island
Daniel C. Verplanck (1762–1834), United States Representative from New York
Daniel W. Voorhees (1827–1897), United States Senator from Indiana
Peter Dumont Vroom (1791–1873), Democratic Party politician
Victor Vroom (born 1932), business school professor at the Yale School of Management
Henry C. Warmoth (1842–1931), Governor of Louisiana
Jacob Aaron Westervelt (1800–1879), shipbuilder and Mayor of New York City (1853–1855)
Peter Meijer (born 1988), United States Representative from Michigan

Sciences

Nicolaas Bloembergen (1920–2017), physicist
Bart J. Bok (1906–1983), astronomer, director of Steward Observatory
Dirk Brouwer (1902–1966), astronomer
Samuel Abraham Goudsmit (1902–1978), physicist famous for jointly proposing the concept of electron spin with George Eugene Uhlenbeck
Anthony Heinsbergen (1894–1981), muralist considered the foremost designer of North American movie theatre interiors
Arend Lijphart (born 1936), political scientist
Willem Johan Kolff (1911–2009), inventor of hemodialysis treatment
Gerard Peter Kuiper (1905–1973), astronomer
Willem Jacob Luyten (1899–1994), astronomer
Robert Moog (1934–2005), a pioneer of electronic music and inventor of the Moog synthesizer
Jan Schilt (1894–1982), Dutch-born astronomer, inventor of the Schilt photometer, Rutherford Professor of Astronomy at Columbia University
Maarten Schmidt (1929–2022), Dutch-born astronomer who measured the distances of astronomical objects called quasars
Hubert Schoemaker (1950–2006), chemist and biotechnological pioneer
Benjamin Spock (1903–1998), paediatrician and author of Baby and Child Care
James Van Allen (1914–2006), astronomer for whom the Van Allen belt is named
Robert J. Van de Graaff (1901–1967), physicist, developed the Van de Graaff generator
Peter van de Kamp (1901–1995), astronomer
Lodewijk van den Berg (born 1932), chemical engineer and astronaut, payload specialist STS-51B Space Shuttle Challenger
Albert Vander Veer (1841–1929), surgeon
Mary van Kleeck (1883–1972), social scientist, feminist, and economic researcher

Businessmen
Cornelius Vanderbilt (1794–1877), founder of Vanderbilt University
Thomas Edison (1847–1931), inventor and businessman; his father was of Dutch descent
Anthony Fokker (1890–1939), aviation pioneer and aircraft manufacturer
Wayne Huizenga (1937-2018), businessman, entrepreneur, and philanthropist
Hank Meijer (born 1952), CEO US supermarket chain Meijer

Sports

David Aardsma (born 1981), Major League Baseball player currently with the Seattle Mariners
Don Ackerman (1930–2011), NBA player
Rick Adelman (born 1946), NBA player and head coach
Lance Armstrong (born 1971), Professional cyclist
Earl W. Bascom (1906–1995), Hall of Fame rodeo champion and rodeo pioneer known as the "father of modern rodeo."
Odell Beckham Jr. (born 1992), NFL player; mother is part Dutch
Hank Beenders (1916–2003), NBA player
Bert Blyleven (born 1951), Major League Baseball player, born in the Netherlands
Kiki Cuyler (1898–1950), Major League Baseball right fielder from 1921 until 1938
Matt den Dekker (born 1987), Major League Baseball center fielder
Vern Den Herder (born 1948), NFL defensive end with Miami Dolphins 1971–82, two-time Super Bowl champ
Sergiño Dest (born 2000), soccer player
Lenny Dykstra (born 1963), award-winning professional baseball player
Robert Eenhoorn (born 1968), Major League Baseball; played for New York Yankees, Anaheim Angels and New York Mets
Rikkert Faneyte (born 1969), Major League Baseball player from 1993 to 1996 for the San Francisco Giants and Texas Rangers
Matt Grevers (born 1985), Olympic swimmer
Cole Hamels (born 1983), Major League Baseball pitcher currently with the Texas Rangers
Harald Hasselbach (born 1967), NFL player
Shea Hillenbrand (born 1975), Major League Baseball player 
Jim Kaat (born 1938), Major League Baseball pitcher, three-time All Star, 16-time Gold Glove winner, and television broadcaster
Kyle Korver (born 1981), NBA basketball player 
Arie Luyendyk (born 1953), auto racing driver, twice winner of the Indianapolis 500
Mark Mulder (born 1977), Major League Baseball pitcher
Swen Nater (born 1950), ABA and NBA player, the only player ever to lead both the NBA and ABA in rebounding
Kirk Nieuwenhuis (born 1987), Major League Baseball player for the Milwaukee Brewers
Jay Riemersma (born 1973), NFL player for the Buffalo Bills
Bas Rutten (born 1965), MMA fighter and color commentator
Curt Schilling (born 1966), Major League Baseball pitcher
Ryan Sheckler (born 1989), skateboarder
Jack Sikma (born 1955), Hall of Fame NBA player, averaged 15.6 points and 9.8 rebounds during 14 seasons; former assistant coach at Minnesota Timberwolves
Luke Sikma (born 1989), basketball player
Julia Smit (born 1987), Olympic swimmer
Erik Spoelstra (born 1970), head coach for the Miami Heat, during their NBA championship win in 2012
Earnie Stewart (born 1969), soccer player who was a regular midfielder for the US national team from 1990s until his retirement in 2005
Greg Stiemsma (born 1985), NBA player
Jermaine Van Buren (born 1980), Major League Baseball player
Tejay van Garderen (born 1988), cyclist
Jeff Van Gundy (born 1962), NBA color commentator, former NBA head coach for the New York Knicks and Houston Rockets
Stan Van Gundy (born 1959), current NBA head coach for the Detroit Pistons
Keith Van Horn (born 1975), NBA player
James van Riemsdyk (born 1989), NHL player for the Philadelphia Flyers
Trevor van Riemsdyk (born 1991), NHL player for the Washington Capitals
Dale Van Sickel (1907–1977), football player, actor and stuntman
Andy Van Slyke (born 1960), Major League Baseball player, first base coach for the Detroit Tigers
Scott Van Slyke (born 1986), Major League Baseball player
Tiffany van Soest (born 1989), Muay Thai kickboxer
Kyle Vanden Bosch (born 1978), former NFL player
Leighton Vander Esch (born 1996), linebacker for the Dallas Cowboys 
Johnny Vander Meer (1914–1997), baseball player, the only pitcher in major league history to pitch two consecutive no-hitters
Logan Vander Velden (born 1971), NBA player
John Vander Wal (born 1966), Major League Baseball player
Peter Vanderkaay (born 1984), Olympic swimmer 
Fred VanVleet (born 1994), NBA player
Justin Verlander (born 1983), Major League Baseball pitcher for the Detroit Tigers
Tiger Woods (born 1975), professional golfer

Theology
 Louis Berkhof (1873–1957), reformed systematic theologian at Calvin Theological Seminary
 Harold Camping (1921–2013), radio broadcaster and evangelist 
 Hank Hanegraaff (born 1950), Christian apologist and president of the Christian Research Institute
 Anthony A. Hoekema (1913–1988), reformed systematic theologian at Calvin Theological Seminary
 Herman Hoeksema (1886–1965), pastor in the Christian Reformed Church and later in the Protestant Reformed Churches, Reformed systematic theologian at the Protestant Reformed Theological School
 Richard Mouw (born 1940), Christian philosopher and apologist and president of Fuller Theological Seminary
 James Olthuis, inter-disciplinary scholar in ethics, hermeneutics, philosophical theology, as well as a theorist and practitioner of psychotherapy at the Institute for Christian Studies
 Alvin Plantinga (born 1932), philosopher known for his work in epistemology, metaphysics, and the philosophy of religion
 Cornelius Plantinga, president of Calvin Theological Seminary
 Robert A. Schuller (born 1954), televangelist and pastor of the Crystal Cathedral in Garden Grove, California, son of Robert H. Schuller
 Robert H. Schuller (1926–2015), televangelist and pastor known around the world through his weekly broadcast The Hour of Power
 Lewis B. Smedes (1921–2002), Christian author, ethicist, and theologian at Fuller Theological Seminary
 Albertus van Raalte (1811–1876), Calvinist preacher and leader of Dutch immigrants to Michigan
 Cornelius Van Til (1895–1987), Christian philosopher, Reformed theologian, and presuppositional apologist
 Geerhardus Vos (1888–1946), professor of Biblical Theology at Calvin Theological Seminary and at Princeton Theological Seminary

Fictional characters

Nate Archibald, character from Gossip Girl
Pete Campbell, character from Mad Men
Goldmember, Austin Powers in Goldmember (2002)
Gregory House, the main character from House
Daniel Jackson, character from Stargate
Rory Jansen, character from The Words
Fox Mulder, The X-Files
Brittany Pierce, character from Glee
Mildred Pierce, character from Mildred Pierce
Moe Szyslak, The Simpsons
Abigail Van Buren, pen name of Pauline Phillips, writer of Dear Abby advice column founded in 1956
Buford van Stomm, character from Phineas and Ferb
Sinjin Van Cleef, character from Victorious
Rex Van de Kamp, husband of Bree Van de Kamp of Desperate Housewives
William Van Den Broeck, character from Random Hearts
Eric van der Woodsen, character from Gossip Girl
Serena van der Woodsen, one of the main cast members of Gossip Girl
Summer van Horne, character from Make It or Break It
Traci van Horne, character from Hannah Montana
Milhouse Van Houten, The Simpsons
Nicholas Van Ryn, Dragonwyck
Rip Van Winkle, main protagonist in Washington Irving's short story of the same name (1819)
Mona Vanderwaal, character from Pretty Little Liars
Dieter Von Cunth, evil character from MacGruber
Jason Voorhees, character from the Friday the 13th series
Bridget "Bee" Vreeland, character from The Sisterhood of the Traveling Pants

Others
Gertrude Baniszewski, American murderer; Father was of Dutch ancestry
Jack Dangermond, founder of ESRI, a Geographic Information Systems (GIS) software company
Sante Kimes, American murderer; Mother was of Dutch ancestry
Alfred Peet (1920–2007), founder of Peet's Coffee and Tea, credited with starting the gourmet coffee revolution in the United States
Jan Pol (born 1942), Dutch-American veterinarian featured on the Incredible Dr. Pol television series, emigrated to the United States from the Netherlands
Kiliaen van Rensselaer (Dutch merchant) (fl. 1596–1643), founder and director of the Dutch West India Company and instrumental in the establishment of New Netherland
Leslie van Houten, former Manson family serving life sentence for murder

References

Dutch Americans

Americans
Dutch